Commercial sorghum is the cultivation and commercial exploitation of species of grasses within the genus Sorghum (often S. bicolor, sometimes Sorghum arundinaceum). These plants are used for grain, fibre and fodder. The plants are cultivated in warmer climates worldwide. Commercial Sorghum species are native to tropical and subtropical regions of Africa and Asia.

Other names include durra, Egyptian millet, feterita, Guinea corn, jwari ज्वारी (Marathi), jowar, juwar, milo, shallu, Sudan grass, cholam (Tamil), jola/ಜೋಳ (Kannada), jonnalu జొన్నలు (Telugu), gaoliang (:zh:高粱), great millet, kafir corn, dura, dari, mtama, and solam.
 
Sorghum has been, for centuries, one of the most important staple foods for millions of poor rural people in the semiarid tropics of Asia and Africa. For some impoverished regions of the world, sorghum remains a principal source of energy, protein, vitamins and minerals. Sorghum grows in harsh environments where other crops do not grow well, just like other staple foods, such as cassava, that are common in impoverished regions of the world. It is usually grown without application of any fertilizers or other inputs by a multitude of small-holder farmers in many countries.

Grain sorghum is the third most important cereal crop grown in the United States and the fifth most important cereal crop grown in the world. In 2010, Nigeria was the world's largest producer of grain sorghum, followed by the United States and India. In developed countries, and increasingly in developing countries such as India, the predominant use of sorghum is as fodder for poultry and cattle. Leading exporters in 2010 were the United States, Australia and Argentina; Mexico was the largest importer of sorghum.

An international effort is under way to improve sorghum farming. The International Crops Research Institute for the Semi-Arid Tropics (ICRISAT) has improved sorghum using traditional genetic improvement and integrated genetic and natural resources management practices. New varieties of sorghum from ICRISAT has now resulted in India producing . Some 194 improved cultivars are now planted worldwide. In India, increases in sorghum productivity resulting from improved cultivars have freed up  of land, enabling farmers to diversify into high-income cash crops and boost their livelihoods. Sorghum is used primarily as poultry feed, and secondarily as cattle feed and in brewing applications.

Origin 

The last wild relatives of commercial sorghum are currently confined to Africa south of the Sahara — although Zohary and Hopf add "perhaps" Yemen and Sudan — indicating its domestication took place there. However, note Zohary and Hopf, "the archaeological exploration of sub-Saharan Africa is yet in its early stages, and we still lack critical information for determining where and when sorghum could have been taken into cultivation." Although rich finds of S. bicolor have been recovered from Qasr Ibrim in Egyptian Nubia, the wild examples have been dated to circa 800–600 BC, and the domesticated ones no earlier than AD 100. The earliest archeological evidence comes from sites dated to the second millennium BC in India and Pakistan — where S. bicolor is not native. These incongruous finds have been interpreted, according again to Zohary and Hopf,

 as indicating: (i) an even earlier domestication in Africa, and (ii) an early migration of domestic sorghum, from East Africa into the Indian subcontinent. This interpretation got further support because several other African grain crops, namely: pearl millet Pennisetum glaucum (L.) R. Br., cow pea Vigna unguiculata (L.) Walp., and hyacinth bean Lablab purpureus (L.) Sweet show similar patterns. Their wild progenitors are restricted to Africa.

Most cultivated varieties of sorghum can be traced back to Africa, where they grow on savanna lands. During the Muslim Agricultural Revolution, sorghum was planted extensively in parts of the Middle East, North Africa and Europe. The name "sorghum" comes from Italian "sorgo", in turn from Latin "Syricum (granum)" meaning "grain of Syria".

Despite the antiquity of sorghum, it arrived late to the Near East. It was unknown in the Mediterranean area into Roman times. Tenth century records indicate it was widely grown in Iraq, and became the principal food of Kirman in Persia. In addition to the eastern parts of the Muslim world, the crop was also grown in Egypt and later in Islamic Spain. From Islamic Spain, it was introduced to Christian Spain and then France (by the 12th century). In the Muslim world, sorghum was typically grown in areas where the soil was poor or the weather too hot and dry to grow other crops.

Sorghum is well adapted to growth in hot, arid or semiarid areas. The many subspecies are divided into four groups — grain sorghums (such as milo), grass sorghums (for pasture and hay), sweet sorghums (formerly called "Guinea corn", used to produce sorghum syrups), and broom corn (for human consumption). The name "sweet sorghum" is used to identify varieties of S. bicolor that are sweet and juicy.

Cultivation 

Sorghum is used for food, fodder, and the production of alcoholic beverages. It is drought-tolerant and heat-tolerant, and is especially important in arid regions. It is an important food crop in Africa, Central America, and South Asia, and is the "fifth most important cereal crop grown in the world".

Use as fodder 
The FAO reports that  were devoted worldwide to sorghum production in 2004. In the US, sorghum grain is used primarily as a maize (corn) substitute for livestock feed because their nutritional values are very similar. Some hybrids commonly grown for feed have been developed to deter predation by birds, and therefore contain a high concentration of tannins and phenolic compounds, which necessitates additional processing to allow the grain to be digested by cattle.

Production trends 
The next four major producers of sorghum, in decreasing quantities, were Nigeria, Ethiopia and Mexico. The other major sorghum producing regions in the world, by harvested quantities, were: Australia, Brazil, China, Burkina Faso, Argentina, Mali, Cameroon, Egypt, India, Niger, Tanzania, Chad, Uganda, and Venezuela.

In the future, use of sorghum may increase in Tanzania, as farmers replace maize with the drought-resistant crop in areas with diminished rainfall caused by climate change. Following lobbying by the ICRISAT-led Hope Project, the Tanzanian government recently included improved varieties of sorghum in its seed subsidy programme and agreed to provide a fertiliser subsidy programme for sorghum for the first time. This means that the government will buy seed from seed companies and sell it to farmers at almost half the market price. Tanzania's farmers have reported that improved sorghum varieties grow quickly, demand less labour and are more resistant to pests and diseases.

The world harvested  of sorghum in 2010.

The allocation of farmland to sorghum crops has been decreasing, while the yields per hectare have been increasing. The largest sorghum crop the world has produced since 1972 was in 1985, with  harvested that year.

Diseases

Growing grain sorghum 

Sorghum requires an average temperature of at least  to produce maximum grain yields in a given year. Maximum photosynthesis is achieved at daytime temperatures of at least . Night time temperatures below  for more than a few days can severely reduce the plants' potential grain production. Sorghum cannot be planted until soil temperatures have reached . The long growing season, usually 90–120 days, causes yields to be severely decreased if plants are not in the ground early enough.

Yields have been found to be boosted by 10–15% when optimum use of moisture and sunlight are available, by planting in  rows instead of the conventional  rows.

Sorghum, in general, is a very competitive crop, and does well in competition with weeds in narrow rows. Sorghum produces a chemical compound called  (an Alkylresorcinol), which the plant uses to combat weeds. The chemical is so effective in preventing the growth of weeds it sometime prohibits the growth of other crops harvested on the same field. To address this problem, researchers at the Agricultural Research Service found two gene sequences believed to be responsible for the enzymes that secrete the chemical compound sorgoleone. The discovery of these gene sequences will help researchers one day in developing sorghum varieties that cause less soil toxicity and potentially target gene sequences in other crops to increase their natural pesticide capabilities, as well.

Insect and diseases are not prevalent in sorghum crops. Birds, however, are a major source of yield loss. Hybrids with higher tannin content and growing the crop in large field blocks are solutions used to combat the birds. The crop may also be attacked by corn earworms, aphids, and some Lepidoptera larvae, including turnip moths.

It is a very high nitrogen-feeding crop. An average hectare producing 6.3 tonnes of grain yield requires 110 kg of nitrogen ( for ), but relatively small amounts of phosphorus and potassium ( of each).

Sorghum's growth habit is similar to that of maize, but with more side shoots and a more extensively branched root system. The plant finds 75% of its water in the top metre of soil, and because of this, in dry areas, the plant's production can be severely affected by the water holding capacity of the soil. By the time the seed heads are filling, optimum water conditions are down to about  every 10 days. Compacted soil or shallow topsoil can limit the plant's ability to deal with drought by limiting its root system. Since these plants have evolved to grow in hot, dry areas, it is essential to keep the soil from compacting and to grow on land with ample cultivated topsoil.

Sorghum's yields are not affected by short periods of drought as severely as other crops such as maize, because it develops its seed heads over longer periods of time, and short periods of water stress do not usually have the ability to prevent kernel development. Even in a long drought severe enough to hamper sorghum production, it will still usually produce some seed on smaller and fewer seed heads. Rarely will one find a kernelless season for sorghum, even under the most adverse water conditions. Sorghum's ability to thrive with less water than maize may be due to its ability to hold water in its foliage better than maize. Sorghum has a waxy coating on its leaves and stems which helps to keep water in the plant, even in intense heat.

Weeds 
Shattercane (weedy S. bicolor) is an unusually problematic weed. Because it intercrosses fairly freely it will take on herbicide resistance traits which are meant to protect the crop and be useful to the farmer. Werle et al., 2016 finds this is governed by genetic distance but all genotypes do this. They also find that it seems impossible at first to completely be rid of Inzen shattercane once it has been produced, even with rotation completely out of sorghum. However by introducing realistic stochasticity they find promising possibilities of stochastic extinction at low levels. Some of these modes produce population dynamics which are chaotic, and some of these progress to extinction.

Uses

Culinary use 

In arid, less developed regions of the world, sorghum is an important food crop, especially for subsistence farmers. It is used to make such foods as couscous, sorghum flour, porridge and molasses.

Bhakri (jolada rotti in northern Karnataka), a variety of unleavened bread usually made from sorghum, is the staple diet in many parts of India, such as Maharashtra state and northern Karnataka state. In eastern Karnataka and the Rayalaseema area of Andhra Pradesh, roti (jonna rotte) made with sorghum is the staple food.

In South Africa, sorghum meal is often eaten as a stiff porridge much like pap. It is called mabele in Northern Sotho and "brown porridge" in English. The porridge can be served with maswi (soured milk) or merogo (a mixture of boiled greens much like collard greens or spinach).

In Ethiopia, sorghum is fermented to make injera flatbread, and in Sudan it is fermented to make kisra. In India, dosa is sometimes made with a sorghum-grain mixture, but rice is more commonly used in place of sorghum.

In the cuisine of the Southern United States, sorghum syrup was used as a sweet condiment, much as maple syrup was used in the North, usually for biscuits, corn bread, pancakes, hot cereals or baked beans. It is uncommon today.

In Arab cuisine, the unmilled grain is often cooked to make couscous, porridges, soups, and cakes. Many poor use it, along with other flours or starches, to make bread. The seeds and stalks are fed to cattle and poultry. Some varieties have been used for thatch, fencing, baskets, brushes and brooms, and stalks have been used as fuel. Northern Karnataka in India, they make chappathis from jola.</ref>

Sorghum seeds can be popped in the same manner as popcorn (i.e., with oil or hot air, etc.), although the popped kernels are smaller than popcorn (see photo on the right).

Sorghum sometimes is used for making tortillas (e.g., in Central America). In El Salvador, they sometimes use sorghum (maicillo) to make tortillas when there is not enough corn.

Since 2000, sorghum has come into increasing use in homemade and commercial breads and cereals made specifically for the gluten-free diet.

Alcoholic beverages 
In China, sorghum is the most important ingredient for the production of distilled beverages, such as maotai and kaoliang wine, as seen in the 1987 film Red Sorghum.

Sorghum beer 
In southern Africa, sorghum is used to produce beer, including the local version of Guinness. In recent years, sorghum has been used as a substitute for other grain in gluten-free beer. Although the African versions are not "gluten-free", as malt extract is also used, truly gluten-free beer using such substitutes as sorghum or buckwheat are now available. Sorghum is used in the same way as barley to produce a "malt" that can form the basis of a mash that will brew a beer without gliadin or hordein (together "gluten") and therefore can be suitable for coeliacs or others sensitive to certain glycoproteins.

In December 2006, Anheuser-Busch of St. Louis, Missouri, introduced  "Redbridge" beer, which is gluten-free and is produced with sorghum as the main ingredient.

African sorghum beer is a brownish-pink beverage with a fruity, sour taste. Its alcohol content can vary between 1% and 8%. African sorghum beer is high in protein, which contributes to foam stability, giving it a milk-like head. Because this beer is not filtered, its appearance is cloudy and yeasty, and may also contain bits of grain. This beer is said to be very thirst-quenching, even if it is traditionally consumed at room temperature.

African sorghum beer is a popular drink primarily among the black community for historical reasons. It became popular with the black community in South Africa in part because it was exempt from the prohibition that applied only to black people and which was lifted in 1962. 

Sorghum beer is also associated with the development of the segregationist "Durban System" in South Africa in the early 20th century. The turn of the 20th century saw growing segregationist tendencies among the white populations of South African towns. Fearful of the alleged diseases of black residents, the white populations of these towns sought to prevent black Africans from gaining permanent residence in urban areas, and separate them from the white communities. Within this context, two municipalities, Durban and Pietermaritzburg, devised a system by which black Africans in their locality would be housed in 'native locations' outside the main towns, with their segregated accommodation paid for from revenues from the municipal monopoly over sorghum beer. This solved the problem of white rate-payers having to foot the cost of segregation, and ensured the whole scheme paid for itself. After the passage of the 1923 Natives (Urban Areas) Act, all municipalities in South Africa were given the powers to enforce racial segregation, and the Durban System was extended throughout the union, ensuring that segregation was paid for from African rents and beerhall monopolies.

Sorghum beer is called bjala in northern Sotho and is traditionally made to mark the unveiling of a loved-one's tombstone. The task of making the beer falls traditionally to women. The process is begun several days before the party, when the women of the community gather together to bring the sorghum and water to a boil in huge cast iron pots over open fires. After the mix has fermented for several days, it is strained - a somewhat labor-intensive task. Sorghum beer is known by many different names in various countries across Africa, including Umqombothi (South Africa) burukuto (Nigeria), pombe (East Africa) and bil-bil (Cameroon). African sorghum beer brewed using grain sorghum undergoes lactic acid fermentation, as well as alcoholic fermentation.

The steps in brewing African sorghum beer are: malting, mashing, souring and alcoholic fermentation. All steps, with the exception of the souring, can be compared to traditional beer brewing.

The souring of African sorghum beer by lactic acid fermentation is responsible for the distinct sour taste. Souring may be initiated using yogurt, sour dough starter cultures, or by spontaneous fermentation. The natural microflora of the sorghum grain maybe also be the source of lactic acid bacteria; a handful of raw grain sorghum or malted sorghum may be mixed in with the wort to start the lactic acid fermentation. Although many lactic acid bacteria strains may be present, Lactobacillus spp. is responsible for the lactic acid fermentation in African sorghum beer.

Commercial African sorghum beer is packaged in a microbiologically active state. The lactic acid fermentation and/or alcoholic fermentation may still be active. For this reason, special plastic or carton containers with vents are used to allow gas to escape. Spoilage is a big safety concern when it comes to African sorghum beer. Packaging does not occur in sterile conditions and many microorganisms may contaminate the beer. Also, using wild lactic acid bacteria increases the chances of spoilage organisms being present. However, the microbiologically active characteristic of the beer also increases the safety of the product by creating competition between organisms. Although aflatoxins from mould were found on sorghum grain, they were not found in industrially produced African sorghum beer.

Other uses 
Sorghum straw (stem fibres) can also be made into excellent wallboard for house building, as well as biodegradable packaging. Since it does not accumulate static electricity, it is also used in packaging materials for sensitive electronic equipment.

Little research has been done to improve sorghum cultivars because the vast majority of sorghum production is done by subsistence farmers. The crop is therefore mostly limited by insects, disease and weeds, rather than by the plant's inherent ability. To improve the plant's viability in sustaining populations in drought-prone areas, a larger capital investment would be necessary to control plant pests and ensure optimum planting and harvesting practices.

In November 2005, however, the US Congress passed a Renewable Fuels Standard as part of the Energy Policy Act of 2005, with the goal of producing  of renewable fuel (ethanol) annually by 2012. Currently, 12% of grain sorghum production in the US is used to make ethanol.

An AP article claims that sorghum-sap-based ethanol has four times the energy yield as corn-based ethanol, but is on par with sugarcane.

Nutrition 

Sorghum is about 70% starch, so is a good energy source. Its starch consists of 70 to 80% amylopectin, a branched-chain polymer of glucose, and 20 to 30% amylose, a straight-chain polymer.

The digestibility of the sorghum starch is relatively poor in its unprocessed form, varying between 33 and 48%. Processing of the grain by methods such as steaming, pressure cooking, flaking, puffing or micronization of the starch increases the digestibility of sorghum starch. This has been attributed to a release of starch granules from the protein matrix, rendering them more susceptible to enzymatic digestion.

On cooking, the gelatinized starch of sorghum tends to return from the soluble, dispersed and amorphous state to an insoluble crystalline state. This phenomenon is known as retrogradation; it is enhanced with low temperatures and high concentrations of starch. Amylose, the linear component of the starch, is more susceptible to retrogradation.

Certain sorghum varieties contain antinutritional factors such as tannins. The presence of tannins is claimed to contribute to the poor digestibility of sorghum starch. Processing in humid thermal environments aids in lowering the antinutritional factors.

Sorghum starch does not contain gluten. This makes it a possible grain for those who are gluten sensitive.

After starch, proteins are the main constituent of sorghum. The essential amino acid profile of sorghum protein is claimed to depend on the sorghum variety, soil and growing conditions. A wide variation has been reported. For example, lysine content in sorghum has been reported to vary from 71 to 212 mg per gram of nitrogen. Some studies on sorghum's amino acid composition suggest albumin and globulin fractions contained high amounts of lysine and tryptophan and in general were well-balanced in their essential amino acid composition. On the other hand, some studies claim sorghum's prolamin fraction was extremely poor in lysine, arginine, histidine and tryptophan and contained high amounts of proline, glutamic acid and leucine. The digestibility of sorghum protein has also been found to vary between different varieties and source of sorghum, ranging from 30 to 70%.

A World Health Organization report suggests the inherent capacity of the existing sorghum varieties commonly consumed in poor countries was not adequate to meet the growth requirements of infants and young children. The report also claimed sorghum alone may not be able to meet the healthy maintenance requirements in adults. A balanced diet would supplement sorghum with other food staples.

Sorghum's nutritional profile includes several minerals. This mineral matter is unevenly distributed and is more concentrated in the germ and the seed coat. In milled sorghum flours, minerals such as phosphorus, iron, zinc and copper decreased with lower extraction rates. Similarly, pearling the grain to remove the fibrous seed coat resulted in considerable reductions in the mineral contents of sorghum. The presence of antinutrition factors such as tannins in sorghum reduces its mineral availability as food. It is important to process and prepare sorghum properly to improve its nutrition value.

Sorghum is a good source of B-complex vitamins. Some varieties of sorghum contain β-carotene which can be converted to vitamin A by the human body; given the photosensitive nature of carotenes and variability due to environmental factors, scientists claim sorghum is likely to be of little importance as a dietary source of vitamin A precursor. Some fat-soluble vitamins, namely D, E and K, have also been found in sorghum grain in detectable, but insufficient, quantities. Sorghum as it is generally consumed is not a source of vitamin C.

Comparison of sorghum to other major staple foods 

The following table shows the nutrient content of sorghum and compares it to major staple foods in a raw form on a dry weight basis to account for their different water contents. Raw forms of these staples, however, are not edible and cannot be digested. These must be prepared and cooked as appropriate for human consumption. In processed and cooked form, the relative nutritional and antinutritional contents of each of these grains is remarkably different from that of the raw forms reported in this table. The nutrition value for each staple food in cooked form depends on the cooking method (for example: boiling, baking, steaming, frying, etc.).

See also 
 3-Deoxyanthocyanidin
 Apigeninidin
 Baijiu, an alcoholic beverage distilled from sorghum
 List of antioxidants in food
 Push–pull technology pest control strategy for maize and sorghum

References

External links 
 FAO Report (1995) "Sorghum and millets in human nutrition"
 "Compendium on post-harvest operations", United Nations FAO — Contains discussion on origin, processing and uses of sorghum
 Alternative Field Crops, Purdue University
 National Grain Sorghum Producers
 National Sweet Sorghum Producers and Processors Association
 Sorghum Growth Stages
 Sequencing of the Sorghum Genome
 Sweet Sorghum Ethanol Association
 Examples of projects using sweet sorghum as an input feedstock for the production of renewable energy

 
Cereals
Tropical agriculture